Descoreba is a genus of moths in the family Geometridae.

Species
 Descoreba simplex Butler, 1878

References

 Descoreba at Markku Savela's Lepidoptera and Some Other Life Forms
 Natural History Museum Lepidoptera genus database

Ennominae
Geometridae genera